Demiurge Studios, Inc. is an American video game developer based in Boston. It was founded in 2002 by Albert Reed, Chris Linder, and Tom Lin.

In February 2015, Demiurge was acquired by Sega and became part of their mobile gaming subsidiary, Sega Networks. In August 2021, the company was acquired by Embracer Group and became a subsidiary of Saber Interactive.

Games

References

External links 
 

2002 establishments in California
2015 mergers and acquisitions
2021 mergers and acquisitions
American companies established in 2002
Companies based in Cambridge, Massachusetts
Indie video game developers
Saber Interactive
Video game companies established in 2002
Video game companies of the United States
Video game development companies